Angus Cameron (July 4, 1826March 30, 1897) was an American lawyer, banker, and politician who served ten years as United States Senator from Wisconsin.  He also served as the 18th speaker of the Wisconsin State Assembly and served two terms in the Wisconsin State Senate, representing La Crosse County.

Early life and career
Cameron was born in Caledonia, New York on July 4, 1826, the fifth child of seven born to Scottish American immigrants Duncan and Sarah McColl Cameron.  He attended Temple Hill Academy in Geneseo, New York, and then the Genesee Wesleyan Seminary in Lima, New York, which is now Syracuse University.  He later studied law with the firm of Wadsworth and Cameron in Buffalo, New York.  He graduated from the State and National Law School in 1853, was admitted to the bar, and practiced with Wadsworth and Cameron.  He later formed a partnership with Frederick H. Wing, which was active in banking as Cameron & Wing.

Political career
In 1857 Cameron moved to La Crosse, Wisconsin, where he continued his legal and banking careers.  Initially a Whig, he joined the Republican Party when it was founded in the mid-1850s.  He served in the Wisconsin State Senate from 1863 to 1864 and 1871 to 1872.  He was a delegate to the 1864 National Union National Convention.  From 1866 to 1867 he served in the Wisconsin State Assembly, and he was Speaker of the Assembly in the 1867 session.

Cameron also served on the University of Wisconsin Board of Regents from 1866 to 1875, and helped found Christ Church of La Crosse.

In February 1875 the Wisconsin State Legislature, in joint session, elected Cameron to the United States Senate, and he served from March 4, 1875 to March 3, 1881.  He did not seek reelection in 1881.  During this term he was appointed chairman of a committee to investigate alleged election fraud in South Carolina during the disputed United States presidential election of 1876.

In February 1881 Senator Matthew H. Carpenter died in office, and on March 10 Cameron was elected to complete the remaining four years of his six-year term.  Cameron took his seat on March 14, and served until March 3, 1885.  He was not a candidate for reelection in 1885.

Death and legacy
After leaving the Senate Cameron returned to his banking and legal interests.  He died in La Crosse on March 30, 1897, and was buried at Oak Grove Cemetery in La Crosse.

Cameron Park in downtown La Crosse was named for him.  The village of Cameron, in Barron County, was also named for him.

Notes

External links

1826 births
1897 deaths
Politicians from La Crosse, Wisconsin
People from Livingston County, New York
State and National Law School alumni
Republican Party United States senators from Wisconsin
Republican Party Wisconsin state senators
Genesee Wesleyan Seminary alumni
19th-century American politicians
Speakers of the Wisconsin State Assembly
Republican Party members of the Wisconsin State Assembly